Don't Know How

"Don't Know How", song from PartyNextDoor 3
"Don't Know How", song from Love Love Love (Roy Kim album)
“Don’t Know How”, song by Ricky Montgomery